The viola amarantina  is a stringed musical instrument from Amarante, Northern Portugal. It is also named viola de dois corações (two-hearted guitar) because of the two heart-shaped frontal openings. It has 10 strings in 5 courses. The strings are made of steel. It is tuned A3 A3, F# F#, B2 B3, G2 G3, D2 D3.

It is traditional to construct the viola amarantina from walnut for the sides, pine for the soundboard and the neck in mahogany.

The viola amarantina is also sometimes played in Cabo Verde.

References

External links
 The Stringed Instrument Database 

String instruments
Portuguese musical instruments